A bronze statue of Kanō Jigorō is installed outside Japan Sport Olympic Square, in Shinjuku, Tokyo, Japan.

External links
 

Bronze sculptures in Japan
Buildings and structures in Shinjuku
Monuments and memorials in Japan
Sculptures of men in Japan
Statues in Japan